Ghazipur City Railway Station (GCT) is located in Ghazipur City of Uttar Pradesh. It lies in the Malgodam Road. It comes under  North Eastern Railway Zone (NER), Gorakhpur under Varanasi division. The station is directly connected to Major Cities of India.

GCT has Double Line Railway Route with electrification of Prayagraj Jn-Varanasi Jn-Ghazipur City-Chhapra Jn Rail Route. And a New Rail line From Mau Junction to Tarighat Station Via : Ghazipur City Station and Bridge on Ganga River.

Important trains of Ghazipur City 
 22419 Ghazipur City–Anand Vihar Terminal, Suhaildev SF Express (via Lucknow Charbagh)
 22420 Anand Vihar Terminal–Ghazipur City, Suhaildev SF Express (via Lucknow Charbagh)
 22433 Ghazipur City  Anand Vihar Terminal, Suhaildev SF Express (via Prayagraj  Junction)
 22434 Anand Vihar Terminal–Ghazipur City, Suhaildev SF Express (via Prayagraj  Junction)
 20942 Ghazipur City–Bandra Terminus SF Express
 20941 Bandra Terminus–Ghazipur City SF Express
 22324 Ghazipur City–Kolkata, Shabd Bhedi SF Express (via Varanasi Junction)
 22323 Kolkata–Ghazipur City, Shabd Bhedi SF Express (via Varanasi Junction)
 13122 Ghazipur City–Kolkata Express (via Chhapra)
 13121 Kolkata–Ghazipur Express (via Chhapra)
 14611 Ghazipur City–Shri Mata Vaishno Devi Katra Express
 14612 Shri Mata Vaishno Devi Katra–Ghazipur City Express

See also 
 Kerakat railway station
 Ghazipur Ghat railway station

External links 
 GCT/Ghazipur City

Railway stations in Ghazipur district
Ghazipur
Varanasi railway division
Transport in Ghazipur